Lim Jee Lynn (born 25 September 1997) is a Malaysian female badminton player. She achieved a career-high ranking of 98 in women's doubles with Joyce Choong.

Career 
She partnered with Joyce Choong in 2016 and they reached the finals of the India International. They achieved runner-up position after losing to their compatriots, Goh Yea Ching and Lim Chiew Sien. In 2017, she formed a new partnership with Yap Zhen. Lim reached her second India International final with Yap but lost to Citra Putri Sari Dewi and Jin Yujia in three games.

Achievements

BWF International Challenge/Series
Women's doubles

 BWF International Challenge tournament
 BWF International Series tournament
 BWF Future Series tournament

References

External links 
 

Living people
1996 births
Malaysian female badminton players
Malaysian sportspeople of Chinese descent
21st-century Malaysian women